Sean Bergenheim (born February 8, 1984) is a Finnish former professional ice hockey winger who played in the National Hockey League (NHL) for the New York Islanders, Tampa Bay Lightning, Florida Panthers and Minnesota Wild.

Playing career 
Bergenheim played in Jokerit of the SM-liiga for three seasons, from 2001 to 2004, winning the Finnish championship in 2002. He was drafted by the New York Islanders as their first pick in the 2002 NHL Entry Draft, 22nd overall. In 2003, Bergenheim signed a three-year contract with the Islanders and played 18 games for the Islanders in his debut season, 2003–04. He scored his first NHL goal—a short-handed goal—against the Pittsburgh Penguins. He was transferred back to Jokerit in January 2004, and moved back to the American Hockey League (AHL)'s Bridgeport Sound Tigers in April for the 2004 Calder Cup playoffs and for the subsequent 2004–05 AHL season, during the 2004–05 NHL lockout.

Bergenheim spent most of the 2005–06 season playing in the AHL for the Sound Tigers. His breakout in the AHL finally brought him back to the Islanders, but he was unable to agree to a new contract with the team in the 2006 off-season, after which he signed with Lokomotiv Yaroslavl in the Russian Superleague.

On October 31, 2006, Bergenheim signed a one-year contract with Frölunda HC of the Swedish Elitserien. In Frölunda, he found instant chemistry with forwards Steve Kariya and Martin Plüss to form a very successful line.

On June 18, 2007, Bergenheim signed a one-year contract with the Islanders to return to the NHL. During the 2007–08 season, his first full season in the NHL, on March 4, 2008, he became the 350th different New York Islander skater to register a goal at Madison Square Garden.

Having scoring 10 goals in 78 games with the Islanders in the 2007–08 season, on July 14, 2008, Bergenheim signed a two-year contract extension with the club. With higher expectations for the 2008–09 season, he scored 7 points in the first 16 games before he was felled by injury and illness that caused him to miss 26 games. Returning to health in the second half of the season, Bergenheim had his first multi-goal game with two goals to help the Islanders shut-out the Buffalo Sabres 2–0 on February 28, 2009. His strong form with New York continued, and on March 7, 2009, Bergenheim recorded his first career NHL hat-trick, against the New Jersey Devils. He finished the season with a career-high 15 goals in 59 games.

After the 2009–10 season, on August 17, 2010, Bergenheim left the Islanders and signed as a free agent to a one-year contract with the Tampa Bay Lightning. In his first appearance in the Stanley Cup playoffs, despite having only 14 goals in 80 games during the regular season, Bergenheim finished with 9 goals in 16 games en route to series victories over the Pittsburgh Penguins and a sweep of the Washington Capitals before the Lightning finally fell to the eventual Stanley Cup champions, the Boston Bruins, in seven games.

On July 1, 2011, Bergenheim signed a four-year, $11 million contract with the Florida Panthers. In the final year of his contract in the 2014–15 season, Bergenheim was used in rotation in the Panthers' starting lineup. After requesting a trade, on February 24, 2015, he was traded (along with a seventh-round pick in the 2016 NHL Entry Draft) to the Minnesota Wild in exchange for a third-round draft pick in the same draft.

At the conclusion of his contract, and as an un-signed free agent over the summer, on October 7, 2015, Bergenheim returned to Europe to sign a one-year contract (with the option for two more years) for the 2015–16 season with SC Bern of the Swiss National League A (NLA). In signing with Bern, Bergenheim re-united with former NHL head coach Guy Boucher from his tenure with the Lightning. Under Boucher's successor, Lars Leuenberger, Bergenheim won the 2016 Swiss championship with Bern, but missed parts of the season (including the playoffs) due to a concussion.

As a free agent in the following off-season, on September 20, 2016, Bergenheim returned to North America to participate in the Anaheim Ducks' training camp on a professional try-out contract. Upon his release from the Ducks' roster, he returned to Europe, signing with Swedish powerhouse Frölunda HC on November 4, 2016, where he had played during the 2006–07 campaign.

In February 2018, Bergenheim announced his retirement from professional hockey.

International play

Bergenheim has represented Finland in the World U18 Championships as well as the World Junior Championships, winning one and three bronze medals, respectively.

Career statistics

Regular season and playoffs

International

Awards and honours

References

External links
 

1984 births
SC Bern players
Bridgeport Sound Tigers players
Finnish expatriate ice hockey players in Russia
Finnish expatriate ice hockey players in Sweden
Finnish expatriate ice hockey players in the United States
Finnish ice hockey left wingers
Florida Panthers players
Frölunda HC players
HIFK (ice hockey) players
Jokerit players
Living people
Lokomotiv Yaroslavl players
Minnesota Wild players
National Hockey League first-round draft picks
New York Islanders draft picks
New York Islanders players
Ice hockey people from Helsinki
Swedish-speaking Finns
Tampa Bay Lightning players